Dildine is a surname. Notable people with the surname include:

Joshua Dildine (born 1984), American artist 
Steve Dildine (born 1984), American football linebacker